"John Brown's Body" (originally known as "John Brown's Song") is a United States marching song about the abolitionist John Brown. The song was popular in the Union during the American Civil War. The tune arose out of the folk hymn tradition of the American camp meeting movement of the late 18th and early 19th century. According to an 1889 account, the original John Brown lyrics were a collective effort by a group of Union soldiers who were referring both to the famous John Brown and also, humorously, to a Sergeant John Brown of their own battalion. Various other authors have published additional verses or claimed credit for originating the John Brown lyrics and tune.

The "flavor of coarseness, possibly of irreverence" led many of the era to feel uncomfortable with the earliest "John Brown" lyrics. This in turn led to the creation of many variant versions of the text that aspired to a higher literary quality. The most famous of these is Julia Ward Howe's "Battle Hymn of the Republic", which was written when a friend suggested, "Why do you not write some good words for that stirring tune?" Kimball suggests that President Lincoln made this suggestion to Howe, though other sources do not agree on this point.

Numerous informal versions and adaptations of the lyrics and music have been created from the mid-1800s to the present, making "John Brown's Body" an example of a living folk music tradition.

History of the tune

"Say, Brothers, Will You Meet Us", the tune that eventually became associated with "John Brown's Body" and the "Battle Hymn of the Republic", was  formed in the American camp meeting circuit of the late 18th century and 1800s. These meetings were usually held in frontier areas, when people who lacked regular access to church services would gather together to worship before traveling preachers. These meetings were important social events, but developed a reputation for wildness in addition to wild religious fervor experienced by attendees. In that atmosphere, where hymns were taught and learned by rote and a spontaneous and improvisational element was prized, both tunes and words changed and adapted in true folk music fashion:

Early versions of "Say, Brothers" included variants, developed as part of this call-and-response hymn singing tradition such as:

This initial line was repeated three times and finished with the tag "On Canaan's happy shore".

The first choruses included lines such as

The familiar "Glory, glory, hallelujah" chorus—a notable feature of the "John Brown Song", the "Battle Hymn of the Republic", and many other texts that used this tune—developed out of the oral camp meeting tradition sometime between 1808 and the 1850s.

Folk hymns like "Say, Brothers" circulated and evolved chiefly through oral tradition rather than through print. In print, the camp meeting song can be traced back as early as 1806–1808, when it was published in camp meeting song collections in South Carolina, Virginia, and Massachusetts.

The tune and variants of the "Say, brothers" hymn text were popular in southern camp meetings, with both African-American and white worshipers, throughout the early 1800s, spread predominantly through Methodist and Baptist camp meeting circuits.  As the southern camp meeting circuit died down in the mid 1800s, the "Say, brothers" tune was incorporated into hymn and tune books and it was via this route that the tune became well known in the mid 1800s throughout the northern U.S. By 1861, "groups as disparate as Baptists, Mormons, Millerites, the American Sunday School Union, and the Sons of Temperance all claimed 'Say Brothers' as their own."

For example, in 1858 words and the tune were published in The Union Harp and Revival Chorister, selected and arranged by Charles Dunbar, and published in Cincinnati. The book contains the words and music of a song "My Brother Will You Meet Me", with the music but not the words of the "Glory Hallelujah" chorus; and the opening line "Say my brother will you meet me". In December 1858 a Brooklyn Sunday school published a hymn called "Brothers, Will You Meet Us" with the words and music of the "Glory Hallelujah" chorus, and the opening line "Say, brothers will you meet us".

Some researchers have maintained that the tune's roots go back to a "Negro folk song", an African-American wedding song from Georgia, or to a British sea shanty that originated as a Swedish drinking song. Anecdotes indicate that versions of "Say, Brothers" were sung as part of African American ring shouts; appearance of the hymn in this call-and-response setting with singing, clapping, stomping, dancing, and extended ecstatic choruses may have given impetus to the development of the well known "Glory hallelujah" chorus.  Given that the tune was developed in an oral tradition, it is impossible to say for certain which of these influences may have played a specific role in the creation of this tune, but it is certain that numerous folk influences from different cultures such as these were prominent in the musical culture of the camp meeting, and that such influences were freely combined in the music-making that took place in the revival movement.

It has been suggested that "Say Brothers, Will You Meet Us", popular among Southern blacks, already had an anti-slavery sub-text, with its reference to "Canaan's happy shore" alluding to the idea of crossing the river to a happier place.  If so, that sub-text was considerably enhanced and expanded as the various "John Brown" lyrics took on themes related to the famous abolitionist and the American Civil War.

Use of the song during the Civil War

In 1861, the new 29th New York Infantry Regiment was stationed in Charles Town, Virginia (since 1863, West Virginia), where John Brown was executed. "The soldiers daily visit the spot [of the hanging] by hundreds, singing a song, the refrain of which is:

Brown's friend and admirer Frederick Douglass wrote in an 1874 newspaper piece:

At Andersonville Prison, which held Union prisoners of war, a visiting Confederate soldier describes it thus:

Use elsewhere
On May 1, 1865, in Charleston, South Carolina, recently freed African-Americans and some white missionaries held a parade of 10,000 people, led by 3,000 Black children singing "John Brown's Body." The march honored 257 dead Union soldiers whose remains the organizers had reburied from a mass grave in a Confederate prison camp. This is considered the first observation of Decoration Day, now known as Memorial Day.

The American consul in Vladivostok, Russia, Richard T. Greener, reported in 1906 that Russian soldiers were singing the song. The context was the 1905 Russian Revolution.

History of the text of "John Brown's Body"

First public performance
At a flag-raising ceremony at Fort Warren, near Boston, on Sunday May 12, 1861, the "John Brown" song was publicly played "perhaps for the first time". The American Civil War had begun the previous month.

Newspapers reported troops singing the song as they marched in the streets of Boston on July 18, 1861, and there was a "rash" of broadside printings of the song with substantially the same words as the undated "John Brown Song!" broadside, stated by Kimball to be the first published edition, and the broadside with music by C. S. Marsh copyrighted on July 16, 1861, also published by C.S. Hall (see images displayed on this page). Other publishers also came out with versions of the "John Brown Song" and claimed copyright.

"Tiger" Battalion writes the lyrics; Kimball's account
In 1890, George Kimball wrote his account of how the 2nd Infantry Battalion of the Massachusetts militia, known as the "Tiger" Battalion, collectively worked out the lyrics to "John Brown's Body". Kimball wrote:
 

According to Kimball, these sayings became bywords among the soldiers and, in a communal effort—similar in many ways to the spontaneous composition of camp meeting songs described above—were gradually put to the tune of "Say, Brothers":

Some leaders of the battalion, feeling the words were coarse and irreverent, tried to urge the adoption of more fitting lyrics, but to no avail. The lyrics were soon prepared for publication by members of the battalion, together with publisher C. S. Hall.  They selected and polished verses they felt appropriate, and may even have enlisted the services of a local poet to help polish and create verses.

The official histories of the old First Artillery and of the 55th Artillery (1918) also record the Tiger Battalion's role in creating the John Brown Song, confirming the general thrust of Kimball's version with a few additional details.

Other claims of authorship

William Steffe
In hymnals and folks song collections, the hymn tune for "Say, Brothers" is often attributed to William Steffe. Robert W. Allen summarizes Steffe's own story of composing the tune:

Steffe finally told the whole story of the writing of the song. He was asked to write it in 1855 or 56 for the Good Will Engine Company of Philadelphia. They used it as a song of welcome for the visiting Liberty Fire Company of Baltimore. The original verse for the song was "Say, Bummers, Will You Meet Us?" Someone else converted the "Say, Bummers" verse into the hymn "Say, Brothers, Will You Meet Us". He thought he might be able to identify that person, but was never able to do so.

Though Steffe may have played a role in creating the "Say, Bummers" version of the song, which seems to be a variant of and owe a debt to both "Say, Brothers" and "John Brown", Steffe couldn't have written the "Glory Hallelujah" tune or the "Say, Brothers" text, both of which had been circulating for decades before his birth.

Thomas Brigham Bishop
Maine songwriter, musician, band leader, and Union soldier Thomas Brigham Bishop (1835–1905) has also been credited as the originator of the John Brown Song, notably by promoter James MacIntyre in a 1916 book and 1935 interview. (Bishop also claimed to have written "Kitty Wells", "Shoo, Fly Don't Bother Me", and "When Johnny Comes Marching Home",—and to have played a role in the composition of Swanee River.)

Other claimants
In the late 1800s, during the song's height of popularity, a number of other authors claimed to have played a part in the origin of the song.
Some sources list Steffe, Bishop, Frank E. Jerome, and others as the tune's composer.  Given the tune's use in the camp meeting circuits in the late 1700s and early 1800s and the first known publication dates of 1806–1808, long before most of these claimants were born, it is apparent that none of these authors composed the tune that was the basis of "Say, Brothers" and "John Brown".

As Annie J. Randall wrote, "Multiple authors, most of them anonymous, borrowed the tune from 'Say, Brothers', gave it new texts, and used it to hail Brown's war to abolish the centuries-old practice of slavery in America." This continual re-use and spontaneous adaptation of existing words and tunes is an important feature of the oral folk music tradition that "Say, Brothers" and the "John Brown Song" were embedded in and no one would have begrudged their use or re-use of these folk materials. Some of those who claimed to have composed the tune may have had a hand in creating and publishing some of the perfectly legitimate variants or alternate texts that used the tune—but all certainly wanted a share of the fame that came with being known as the author of this very well known tune.

Creation of other versions
Once "John Brown's Body" became popular as a marching song, more literary versions of the "John Brown" lyrics were created for the "John Brown" tune.  For example, William Weston Patton wrote his influential version in October 1861, which was published in the Chicago Tribune, 16 December of that year. The "Song of the First of Arkansas" was written, or written down, by Capt. Lindley Miller in 1864, although (typical of the confusion of authorship among the variants and versions) a similar text with the title "The Valiant Soldiers" is also attributed to Sojourner Truth. "The President's Proclamation" was written by Edna Dean Proctor in 1863 on the occasion of the Emancipation Proclamation.  Other versions include the "Marching song of the 4th Battalion of Rifles, 13th Reg., Massachusetts Volunteers" and the "Kriegslied der Division Blenker", written for the Blenker Division, a group of German soldiers who had participated in the European revolutions of 1848/49 and fought for the Union in the American Civil War.

Other related texts
The tune was later also used for "The Battle Hymn of the Republic" (written in November 1861, published in February 1862; this song was directly inspired by "John Brown's Body"), "Marching Song of the First Arkansas", "The Battle Hymn of Cooperation", "Bummers, Come and Meet Us" (see facsimile), and many other related texts and parodies during and immediately after the American Civil War period.

The World War II song "Blood on the Risers" is set to the tune, and includes the chorus "Glory, glory (or Gory, gory), what a hell of a way to die/And he ain't gonna jump no more!"

The tune was used for perhaps the most well-known labor-union song in the United States, "Solidarity Forever".  The song became an anthem of the Industrial Workers of the World and all unions that sought more than workplace concessions, but a world run by those who labor.

Sailors are known to have adapted "John Brown's Body" into a sea shanty—specifically, into a "Capstan Shanty", used during anchor-raising.

The "John Brown" tune has proven popular for folk-created texts, with many irreverent versions created over the years. "The Burning of the School" is a well-known parody sung by schoolchildren, and another version that begins "John Brown's baby has a cold upon his chest" is often sung by children at summer camps.

An African-American version was recorded as "We'll hang Jeff Davis from a sour apple tree". Similarly, a fight song at the University of Pennsylvania set to the same melody begins, "Hang Jeff Davis from a sour apple tree."

As a common soccer chant, it is generally called "Glory Glory".

A version of the song was also sung by French paratroopers: "oui nous irons tous nous faire casser la gueule en coeur / mais nous reviendrons vainqueurs" meaning "yes, we'll get our skulls broken in choir / but we'll come back victorious". 

In Sri Lanka it was adapted into a bilingual (English and Sinhala) song sung at cricket matches—notably at the Royal-Thomian, with the lyrics "We'll hang all the Thomians on the cadju-puhulang tree...." Another adaptation sung at the annual match between the Colombo Law and Medical colleges went "Liquor arsenalis and the cannabis indica...." This was adapted into a trilingual song by Sooty Banda.

The music is used for a German-language children's song by Frank und seine Freunde called "Alle Kinder lernen lesen" translated to "All Children Learn to Read".

Len Chandler sang a song called "Move on over" to the tune on Pete Seeger's Rainbow Quest TV show.

Lyrics
The lyrics used with the "John Brown" tune generally increase in complexity and syllable count as they move from a simple, orally transmitted camp meeting song to an orally composed marching song to more consciously literary versions.

The increasing syllable count led to an ever-increasing number of dotted rhythms in the melody to accommodate the increased number of syllables.  The result is that the verse and chorus, which were musically identical in "Say, Brothers", became quite distinct rhythmically—though still identical in melodic profile—in "John Brown's Body".

The trend towards ever more elaborate rhythmic variations of the original melody became even more pronounced in the later versions of the "John Brown Song" and in the "Battle Hymn of the Republic", which have far more words and syllables per verse than the early versions. The extra words and syllables are fit in by adding more dotted rhythms to the melody and by including four separate lines in each verse rather than repeating the first line three times. The result is that in these later versions the verse and the chorus became even more distinct rhythmically and poetically though still remaining identical in their underlying melodic profile.

"Say, Brothers"

"John Brown's Body" (a number of versions closely similar to this published in 1861)

Version of William Weston Patton
William Weston Patton, an influential abolitionist and pastor, composed his "The New John Brown Song" in the fall of 1861 and published it in the Chicago Tribune, December 16, 1861:

See also
 Triumphal March (Triumphal March on the Occasion of the World's Columbian Exposition in Chicago, 1893)

Notes

References

Further reading
 Hall, Roger Lee (2012). "Glory Hallelujah" Songs and Hymns of the Civil War Era. Stoughton: PineTree Press.
 Scholes, Percy A. (1955). "John Brown's Body", The Oxford Companion of Music. Ninth edition. London: Oxford University Press.
 
 Vowell, Sarah. (2005).  "John Brown's Body", in The Rose and the Briar: Death, Love and Liberty in the American Ballad.  Ed. by Sean Wilentz and Greil Marcus.  New York: W. W. Norton.

External links

 Example version of "John Brown's Body" (MIDI)
 Sheet music for "John Brown's Song", from Project Gutenberg
 The Story of the John Brown Song
 free-scores.com

1850s songs
Abolitionism in the United States
American folk songs
Body
Songs of the American Civil War
Cultural depictions of John Brown (abolitionist)
Songs about activists
Monuments and memorials to John Brown (abolitionist)